Plateaux Region may refer to :

Plateaux Region, Congo
Plateaux Region, Togo

See also

 Plateau (disambiguation)

Region name disambiguation pages